Edward R. Murphy may refer to:

 Eddie Murphy (Edward Regan Murphy, born 1961), American comedian, actor, writer, singer, and producer
 Edward R. Murphy (military officer) (born 1937), United States military figure